HSwMS Sundsvall (J12) was a Swedish destroyer, later rebuilt as a frigate, in the four-ship . The ship was named after the Swedish coastal city of Sundsvall. Sundsvall was laid down in 1942 during the Second World War, and was commissioned on 17 September 1943. She survived the war, and was modified and redesigned as a frigate in 1965. She was kept in service by the Swedish Navy until 1982, and was then used for testing of the Navy's RBS-15 anti-ship missile. The ship was later sold to Spain for scrapping.

Design

Sundsvall was 97.5 meters long and 9.2 meters wide. The hull was made of steel while the superstructures were constructed of light metal. The main superstructure was just forward of midships and housed among other the galley, wheelhouse and navigation bridge and the command bridge. The machine consisted of three Penhoët A oil-fired boilers which generated steam for two of the de Laval steam turbines of 36,000 horsepower, which in turn drove two propellers. This machinery gave the ships a maximum speed of 39 knots. The main guns consisted of three Bofors 12 cm M/24 naval guns, one at bow and the rest in superfiring at stern. The air defense consisted of eight Bofors 40 mm m/36 anti-aircraft guns, consisted of two single guns on each side of midship and two twin guns on a platform at the aft. In addition, there were four Bofors 20 mm m/40 anti-aircraft guns, two 8 mm lvksp m/36 machine guns, torpedo tubes, and more than 40 mines and 16 depth charges could be carried.

History
Sundsvall was built at Eriksbergs Mekaniska Verkstad in Gothenburg and was launched on 20 October 1942 and was delivered to the Swedish Navy on 17 September 1943. After delivery, Sundsvall was put into the Coastal Fleet, where she served during the rest of World War II.

Conversion
In the mid 1960s, Sundsvall underwent extensive rebuilding. The front and aft 12 cm guns were replaced with 57 mm m/50 D anti-aircraft guns and the third was removed and replaced by a Bofors 37.5 cm M/50 anti-submarine rocket launcher. Additionally, two more rack-deployed m/33 depth charges were added and the mining capacity was extended to 130 mines. A helicopter platform was built and a new fire-control system was installed with a new radar antenna in a radome on the bridge deck. In 1965 the ship was reclassified to frigate and in 1966 the conversion was completed.

Fate
Sundsvall was decommissioned on 1 July 1982, after which she was used as a target ship for test firing with RBS-15 before she was sold for scrap in Spain in 1984.

References

Notes

Print

Frigates of Sweden
Visby-class destroyers
World War II destroyers
1942 ships
Ships built in Gothenburg